is a Japanese dish of prepared , usually with some sugar and salt, accompanied by a variety of , such as seafood, often raw, and vegetables.

The inventor of modern sushi is believed to be Hanaya Yohei, who invented nigiri-zushi, a type of sushi most known today, in which seafood is placed on hand-pressed vinegared rice, around 1824 in the Edo period (1603–1867). It was the fast food of the chōnin class in the Edo period.

Sushi is traditionally made with medium-grain white rice, though it can be prepared with brown rice or short-grain rice. It is very often prepared with seafood, such as squid, eel, yellowtail, salmon, tuna or imitation crab meat. Many types of sushi are vegetarian.

Sushi is sometimes confused with sashimi, a similar dish in Japanese cuisine that consists of thinly sliced raw fish or occasionally meat.

History

The fish was fermented with rice vinegar, salt, and rice, after which the rice was discarded. The first mention of sushi is in a Chinese dictionary thought to be from the 4th Century, in this instance referring to salted fish that had been placed in cooked or steamed rice, which caused it to undergo a fermentation process.

The lacto-fermentation of the rice prevents the fish from spoiling. When wet-field rice cultivation was introduced during the Yayoi period, lakes and rivers would flood during the rainy season, and fish would get caught in the rice paddy fields. Pickling was a way to preserve the excess fish and guarantee food for the following months, and  became an important source of protein for Japanese consumers. The term sushi literally means "sour-tasting", as the overall dish has a sour and umami or savory taste.
In addition to increasing the rice's sourness, the vinegar significantly increased the dish's longevity, causing the fermentation process to be shortened and eventually abandoned.

It was not until the Edo period (1603–1868) that fresh fish was served over vinegared rice and nori. The particular style of today's  became popular in Edo (contemporary Tokyo) in the 1820s or 1830s. One common story of 's origins is of the chef Hanaya Yohei (1799–1858), who invented or perfected the technique in 1824 at his shop in Ryōgoku.

The earliest written mention of sushi in English described in the Oxford English Dictionary is in an 1893 book, A Japanese Interior, where it mentions sushi as "a roll of cold rice with fish, sea-weed, or some other flavoring". There is an earlier mention of sushi in James Hepburn's Japanese–English dictionary from 1873, and an 1879 article on Japanese cookery in the journal Notes and Queries.

Types

The common ingredient in all types of sushi is vinegared sushi rice. Fillings, toppings, condiments, and preparation vary widely.

serves the rice in a bowl and tops it with a variety of raw fish and vegetable garnishes. It is popular because it is filling, fast, and easy to make.
  (Edo-style scattered sushi) is served with uncooked ingredients in an artful arrangement.
  (Kansai-style sushi) consists of cooked or uncooked ingredients mixed in the body of rice.
  (Kyushu-style sushi) uses rice wine over vinegar in preparing the rice and is topped with shrimp, sea bream, octopus, shiitake mushrooms, bamboo shoots, and shredded omelette.

is a pouch of fried tofu typically filled with sushi rice alone. According to Shinto lore,  is named after the god Inari. Foxes, messengers of Inari, are believed to have a fondness for fried tofu, and an  roll has pointed corners that resemble fox ears.

Regional variations include pouches made of a thin omelette (or) instead of tofu.

Cone sushi is a variant of  originating in Hawaii that may include green beans, carrots, or gobo along with rice, wrapped in a triangular  piece.

Short-grain white rice is usually used, although short-grain brown rice, like olive oil on nori, is now becoming more widespread among the health-conscious. Rarely, sweet rice is mixed in  rice.

Nowadays, the rice in  can be many kinds of black rice, boiled rice, and cereals. Besides the common ingredients listed above, some varieties may include cheese, spicy cooked squid, lunch meat, sausage, bacon or spicy tuna. The nori may be brushed with sesame oil or sprinkled with sesame seeds. In a variation, sliced pieces of  may be lightly fried with egg coating.

 is a large, cylindrical style of sushi, usually with nori on the outside. They are often made with two, three, or more fillings that are chosen for their complementary tastes and colors.  are often vegetarian, and may use strips of cucumber,  gourd,  (bamboo shoots), or lotus root. Strips of  omelette, tiny fish roe, chopped tuna, and  whitefish flakes are typical non-vegetarian fillings. Traditionally, the vinegared rice is lightly seasoned with salt and sugar. Popular proteins are fish cakes, imitation crab meat, egg, tuna, or shrimp.
By 2000 the custom had spread to all of Japan.  is roll composed of seven ingredients considered to be lucky. The typical ingredients include , egg, eel, and shiitake.  often include other ingredients too. People usually eat the  while facing the direction considered to be auspicious that year.
  is a type of small cylindrical sushi with nori on the outside.
  is a kind of  filled with cucumber. Traditionally,  is consumed to clear the palate between eating raw fish and other kinds of food so that the flavors of the fish are distinct from the tastes of other foods.
  is a kind of  filled with raw tuna. Although it is believed that the word , meaning "red hot iron", alludes to the color of the tuna flesh or salmon flesh, it actually originated as a quick snack to eat in gambling dens called , much like the origins of the sandwich. 
  is a kind of  filled with negitoro, aka scallion and chopped tuna. Fatty tuna is often used in this style. 
  is a kind of  filled with canned tuna tossed with mayonnaise.
  is a large cone-shaped style of sushi with nori on the outside and the ingredients spilling out the wide end. For optimal taste and texture,  must be eaten quickly after being made because the nori cone soon absorbs moisture from the filling and loses its crispness, making it somewhat difficult to bite through. For this reason, the nori in pre-made or take-out temaki is sealed in plastic film, which is removed immediately before eating.

Modern 

 is a traditional form of fermented sushi. Skinned and gutted fish are stuffed with salt, placed in a wooden barrel, doused with salt again, then weighed down with a heavy  (pickling stone). As days pass, water seeps out and is removed. After six months, this sushi can be eaten, remaining edible for another six months or more.

consists of an oblong mound of sushi rice that a chef typically presses between the palms of the hands to form an oval-shaped ball and a topping (the ) draped over the ball. It is usually served with a bit of wasabi; toppings are typically fish such as salmon, tuna, or other seafood. Certain toppings are typically bound to the rice with a thin strip of nori, most commonly octopus, freshwater eel, sea eel, squid, and sweet egg.

 is a special type of : an oval, hand-formed clump of sushi rice that has a strip of nori wrapped around its perimeter to form a vessel that is filled with some soft, loose or fine-chopped ingredient that requires the confinement of nori such as roe, oysters,  (sea urchin roe), sweetcorn with mayonnaise, scallops, and quail eggs.  was invented at the  restaurant in 1941; its invention significantly expanded the repertoire of soft toppings used in sushi.

 is a style of sushi made by pressing rice and fish into a ball-shaped form by hand using a plastic wrap.

The block is removed from the mold and then cut into bite-sized pieces. In , all the ingredients are either cooked or cured, and raw fish is never used.

Western-style sushi

The increasing popularity of sushi worldwide has resulted in variations typically found in the Western world but rarely in Japan. A notable exception to this is the use of salmon. The Japanese have eaten salmon since prehistory; however, caught salmon in nature often contains parasites and must be cooked or cured for its lean meat to be edible. On the other side of the world, in the 1960s and 1970s, Norwegian entrepreneurs started experimenting with aquaculture farming. The big breakthrough was when they figured out how to raise salmon in net pens in the sea. Being farm-raised, the Atlantic salmon reportedly showed advantages over the Pacific salmon, such as no parasites, easy animal capture, and could be grown with higher fat content. With government subsidies and improved techniques, they were so successful in raising fatty and parasite-free salmon they ended up with a surplus. Norway has a small population and limited market; therefore, they looked to other countries to export their salmon. The first Norwegian salmon was imported into Japan in 1980, accepted conventionally, for grilling, not for sushi. Salmon had already been consumed in North America as an ingredient in sushi as early as the 1970s. Salmon sushi did not become widely accepted in Japan until a successful marketing partnership in the late 1980s between a Norwegian businessman tasked with helping the Norwegian salmon industry and the Japanese food supplier Nichirei.

A wide variety of popular rolls ( and ) have evolved since.

is a medium-sized cylindrical style of sushi with two or more fillings and was developed as a result of the creation of the California roll, as a method originally meant to hide the nori.  differs from other  because the rice is on the outside and the nori inside. The filling is surrounded by nori, then a layer of rice, and optionally an outer coating of some other ingredients such as roe or toasted sesame seeds. It can be made with different fillings, such as tuna, crab meat, avocado, mayonnaise, cucumber, or carrots.

Examples of variations include the rainbow roll (an inside-out topped with thinly sliced  and avocado) and the caterpillar roll (an inside-out topped with thinly sliced avocado). Also commonly found is the "rock and roll" (an inside-out roll with barbecued freshwater eel and avocado with toasted sesame seeds on the outside).

In Brazil,  and other sushi pieces include cream cheese in their recipe. Uncommon for the traditional recipe, this is the most common ingredient used in preparing sushi in the country.  also often contains a large amount of cream cheese and is extremely popular in restaurants.

American-style 

Other rolls may include a variety of ingredients, including chopped scallops, spicy tuna, beef or chicken teriyaki roll, okra, and assorted vegetables such as cucumber and avocado, and the tempura roll, where shrimp tempura is inside the roll or the entire roll is battered and fried tempura-style. In the Southern United States, many sushi restaurants prepare rolls using crawfish. Sometimes, rolls are made with brown rice or black rice, known as forbidden rice, which appear in Japanese cuisine as well.

Per Food and Drug Administration regulations, raw fish served in the United States must be frozen before serving to kill parasites.

Since rolls are often made to order, it is not unusual for the customer to specify the exact ingredients desired (e.g., salmon roll, cucumber roll, avocado roll, tuna roll, shrimp or tuna tempura roll, etc.). Though the menu names of dishes often vary by restaurant, some examples include the following:

Canada
Many of the styles seen in the United States are also seen in Canada and their own. Doshi (a portmanteau of sushi and donut) is a donut-shaped rice ball on a deep-fried crab or imitation crab cake topped with sushi ingredients. Sushi cake is made of crab meat, avocado, shiitake mushroom, salmon, spicy tuna, and tobiko and served on sushi rice then torched with spicy mayo, BBQ sauce, balsamic reduction, and dotted with caper and garlic chips. Sushi pizza is deep fried rice or crab/imitation crab cake topped with mayo and various sushi ingredients.

Mexico and the Western United States

Sinaloan sushi originated in Sinaloa, Mexico and has been available in the Western United States since 2013.

Sushi in Asia

South Korea

Ingredients

All sushi has a base of specially prepared rice, complemented with other ingredients. Traditional Japanese sushi consists of rice flavored with vinegar sauce and various raw or cooked ingredients.

It must be cooled to room temperature before being used for a sushi filling, or it will get too sticky while seasoned.

Sushi rice is prepared with short-grain Japanese rice, which has a consistency that differs from long-grain strains such as those from India, Sri Lanka, Bangladesh, Thailand, and Vietnam. The essential quality is its stickiness or glutinousness, although the type of rice used for sushi differs from glutinous rice. Freshly harvested rice typically contains too much water and requires extra time to drain the rice cooker after washing. In some fusion cuisine restaurants, short-grain brown rice and wild rice are also used.

There are regional variations in sushi rice, and individual chefs have their methods. Most of the variations are in the rice vinegar dressing: the Kantō region (or East Japan) version of the dressing commonly uses more salt; in Kansai region (or West Japan), the dressing has more sugar.

Nori

Nori is a type of algae traditionally cultivated in the harbors of Japan. Originally, algae was scraped from dock pilings, rolled out into thin, edible sheets, and dried in the sun, similar to making rice paper. Today, the commercial product is farmed, processed, toasted, packaged, and sold in sheets.

To produce  and some other , an appropriately-sized piece of nori is cut from a whole sheet.

Nori by itself is an edible snack and is available with salt or flavored with teriyaki sauce. The flavored variety, however, tends to be of lesser quality and is not suitable for sushi.

When making , a paper-thin omelette may replace a sheet of nori as the wrapping.

The ingredients used inside sushi are called  and are, typically, varieties of fish. For culinary, sanitary, and aesthetic reasons, the minimum quality and freshness of fish to be eaten raw must be superior to that of fish which is to be cooked. Sushi chefs are trained to recognize important attributes, including smell, color, firmness, and freedom from parasites that may go undetected in a commercial inspection. Commonly used fish are tuna, Japanese amberjack, yellowtail, snapper, mackerel, and salmon. Most nigiri sushi will have completely raw toppings, called .

Other seafoods such as squid, eel ( and ), pike conger, octopus, shrimp ( and ), clam (and ), fish roe (and ), sea urchin, crab, and various kinds of shellfish (abalone, prawn, scallop) are the most popular seafoods in sushi. Oysters are less common, as the taste is thought to not go well with the rice. , or imitation crab stick, is commonly substituted for real crab, most notably in California rolls.

Tofu, eggs (in the form of slightly sweet, layered omelette called ), and raw quail eggs (as a  topping) are also common.

Condiments
Sushi is commonly eaten with condiments. Japanese-style mayonnaise is a common condiment in Japan on salmon, pork, and other sushi cuts.

An imitation wasabi, made from horseradish, mustard powder, and green dye, is common. It is found at lower-end  restaurants, in bento box sushi, and at most restaurants outside Japan. If manufactured in Japan, it may be labelled "Japanese Horseradish". The spicy compound in both true and imitation wasabi is allyl isothiocyanate, which has well-known anti-microbial properties. However, true wasabi may contain some other antimicrobials as well.

 (sweet, pickled ginger) is eaten in between sushi courses to both cleanse the palate and aid in digestion. In Japan, green tea is invariably served together with sushi.

These dividers prevent the flavors of neighboring pieces of sushi from mixing and help to achieve an attractive presentation. Using actual leaves had the added benefit of releasing antimicrobial phytoncides when cut, thereby extending the limited shelf life of the sushi.

Sushi bento boxes are a staple of Japanese supermarkets and convenience stores. As these stores began rising in prominence in the 1960s, the labor-intensive cut leaves were increasingly replaced with green plastic to lower costs. This coincided with the increased prevalence of refrigeration, which extended sushi's shelf life without the need for cut leaves. Today plastic strips are commonly used in sushi bento boxes and, to a lesser degree, in sushi presentations found in sushi bars and restaurants. In store-sold or to-go packages of sushi, the plastic leaf strips are often used to prevent the rolls from coming into early or unwanted contact with the ginger and wasabi included with the dish.

Nutrition

Other vegetables wrapped in sushi also offer various vitamins and minerals. Many of the seafood ingredients also contain omega-3 fatty acids, which have a variety of health benefits. The omega-3 fatty acids found in fish has certain beneficial properties, especially on cardiovascular health, natural anti-inflammatory compounds, and play a role in brain function.

Generally, sushi is not a particularly fattening food. However, rice in sushi contains a fair amount of carbohydrates, and other ingredients such as mayonnaise added to sushi rolls might increase the caloric content. Sushi also has a relatively high sodium content, especially contributed from soy sauce seasoning.

Health risks

Potential chemical and biological hazards in sushi include environmental contaminants, pathogens, and toxins.

Large marine apex predators such as tuna (especially bluefin) can harbor high levels of methylmercury, one of many toxins of marine pollution. Frequent or significantly large consumption of methylmercury can lead to developmental defects when consumed by certain higher-risk groups, including women who are pregnant or may become pregnant, nursing mothers, and young children. A 2021 study in Catalonia, Spain reported that the estimated exposure to methylmercury in sushi consumption by adolescents exceeded the tolerable daily intake.

A 2011 article reported approximately 18 million people infected with fish-borne flukes worldwide. Such an infection can be dangerous for expecting mothers due to the health risks that medical interventions or treatment measures may pose on the developing fetus. Parasitic infections can have a wide range of health impacts, including bowel obstruction, anemia, liver disease, and more. These illnesses' impact can pose health concerns for the expecting mother and baby.

Sashimi or other types of sushi containing raw fish present a risk of infection by three main types of parasites:
 Clonorchis sinensis, a fluke which can cause clonorchiasis
 Anisakis, a roundworm which can cause anisakiasis
 Diphyllobothrium, a tapeworm which can cause diphyllobothriasis

For these reasons, EU regulations forbid using raw fish that had not previously been frozen. It must be frozen at temperatures below  in all product parts for no less than 24 hours. Super-freezing destroys parasites, and also prevents oxidation of the blood in tuna flesh that causes discoloration at temperatures above .

Calls for stricter analysis and regulation of seafood include improved product description. A 2021 DNA study in Italy found 30%-40% of fish species in sushi incorrectly described.

Some forms of sushi, notably those containing the fugu pufferfish and some kinds of shellfish, can cause severe poisoning if not prepared properly. Fugu consumption, in particular, can be fatal. Fugu fish has a lethal dose of tetrodotoxin in its internal organs and, by law in many countries, must be prepared by a licensed fugu chef who has passed the prefectural examination in Japan. Licensing involves a written test, a fish-identification test, and a practical test that involves preparing the fugu and separating out the poisonous organs; only about 35 percent of applicants pass.

Sustainable sushi

Sustainable sushi is made from fished or farmed sources that can be maintained or whose future production does not significantly jeopardize the ecosystems from which it is acquired.

Presentation

Traditionally, sushi is served on minimalist Japanese-style, geometric, mono- or duo-tone wood or lacquer plates, keeping with this cuisine's aesthetic qualities.

Many sushi restaurants offer fixed-price sets selected by the chef from the catch of the day. Sushi restaurants will often have private booth dining, where guests are asked to remove their shoes, leaving them outside the room; However, most sushi bars offer diners a casual experience with an open dining room concept.

Sushi may be served  (sushi train) style: color-coded plates of sushi are placed on a conveyor belt from which diners pick as they please. After finishing, the bill is tallied by counting how many plates of each color have been taken. Newer  restaurants use barcodes or RFID tags embedded in the dishes to manage elapsed time after the item was prepared.

There is a practice called  which entails serving sushi on the naked body of a woman.

Glossary
Some specialized or slang terms are used in the sushi culture. Most of these terms are used only in sushi bars.
 : , refers to green tea.  in usual Japanese.
 : Sweet, pickled and sliced ginger, or sushi ginger.  in standard Japanese.
 : "Jewel". Sweet, cube-shaped omelette.  in standard Japanese.
 : "Violet" or "purple" (color). Soy sauce.  in standard Japanese.
A reversal of the standard Japanese .
 : "Compliment".
 : Vinegar rice or rice.
 : Sweet thick sauce mainly made of soy sauce.  in standard Japanese.

Etiquette

Unlike sashimi, which is almost always eaten with chopsticks,  is traditionally eaten with the fingers, even in formal settings. Although it is commonly served on a small platter with a side dish for dipping, sushi can also be served in a bento, a box with small compartments that hold the various dishes of the meal.

Soy sauce is the usual condiment, and sushi is normally served with a small sauce dish or a compartment in the bento. Traditional etiquette suggests that the sushi is turned over so that only the topping is dipped to flavor it; the rice—which has already been seasoned with rice wine vinegar, sugar, salt, mirin, and kombu—would otherwise absorb too much soy sauce and would fall apart.

Traditionally, the sushi chef will add an appropriate amount of wasabi to the sushi while preparing it, and the diner should not add more. However, today, wasabi is more a matter of personal taste, and even restaurants in Japan may serve wasabi on the side for customers to use at their discretion, even when there is wasabi already in the dish.

Utensils used in making sushi

Gallery

See also

 , Filipino fermented fish and rice similar to 
 , Korean variant of 
 Customs and etiquette in Japanese dining
 List of sushi and sashimi ingredients
 List of sushi restaurants
 , Thai fermented fish and rice similar to 
 , sushi presented on nude female body
 , Japanese knife to slice raw fish and seafood
 Spam musubi, Hawaiian variant of 
 Sushi machine

References

Further reading

External links

 WikiHow page on making sushi rice

 
Articles containing video clips
Japanese cuisine
Seafood dishes
Japanese rice dishes
National dishes
Seafood and rice dishes
Potentially dangerous food
Sliced foods
Types of food
Uncooked fish dishes
Japanese words and phrases